Pulsed electromagnetic field therapy (PEMFT, or PEMF therapy), also known as low field magnetic stimulation (LFMS) is the use of electromagnetic fields in an attempt to heal non-union fractures and depression. By 2007 the FDA had cleared several such stimulation devices.

In 2013 the U.S. Food and Drug Administration (FDA) warned a manufacturer for promoting the device for unapproved uses such as cerebral palsy and spinal cord injury.

Use

Delayed- and non-union fractures 

While PEMF therapy is claimed to offer some benefits in the treatment of fractures, the evidence is inconclusive and is insufficient to inform current clinical practice.
PEMFs is generally not among the guidelines to treat bone and osteochondral defects. Notwithstanding, there is strong evidence for ELF-PEMF treatment. Pulsed Electromagnetic Fields promote the synthesis of skeletal extracellular matrix. The physiologic process of the response of skeletal cells to PEMF is the synthesis of extracellular matrix structural and signaling molecules in the wound. The result of the signaling processes is to instruct skeletal cells to synthesize structural extracellular matrix and signaling molecules and enhance the ability of skeletal tissues to respond to changing physicochemical environments and biomechanical demands, and facilitate healing.
A reduction in time to union and an increase in the percentage of fracture healing in PEMF-stimulated patients compared with controls was reported in fresh tibial fractures, and in femoral neck fractures.

History 
Prior to the year 2000, in parallel with the PEMF research being done in Western Europe, the United States, and Japan, a great deal of scientific work was being done in scientific isolation behind the Iron Curtain, as summarized in a detailed technical report, showing scientific evidence for promising benefits from the use of PEMF for a very wide range of applications including peripheral vascular disease, lung disease, gastrointestinal disease, neurological disease, rheumatic disease, pediatrics, dermatology, surgery, gynecology, oral medicine, otorhinolaryngology, ophthalmology, immunity, inflammation, reproduction, and tumors, based on over 200 referenced scientific papers involving both human and animal studies.

Veterinarians were the first health professionals to use PEMF therapy, usually to attempt to heal broken legs in racehorses.
In 2004, a pulsed electromagnetic field system was approved by the FDA as an adjunct to cervical fusion surgery in patients at high risk for non-fusion. On 8/9 September 2020 the FDA recommended to shift PEMF medical devices from the Class 3 category to a Class 2 status. PEMF devices that have been FDA cleared are able to make health claims that require a doctor's prescription for use.

Although claims that electricity might aid bone healing were reported as early as 1841, it was not until the mid-1950s that scientists seriously studied the subject. During the 1970s, Bassett and his team introduced a new approach which attempted to treat delayed fractures; a technique that employed a very specific biphasic low frequency signal to be applied for non-union/delayed fractures. The use of electrical stimulation in the lumbosacral region was first attempted by Alan Dwyer of Australia.

Wellness devices 

The original PEMF devices consisted of a Helmholtz coil which generated a magnetic field. The patient's body was placed inside the magnetic field to deliver treatment. Today, the majority of PEMF wellness devices resemble a typical yoga mat in dimensions but are slightly thicker to house several flat spiral coils to produce an even electromagnetic field.  A frequency generator is then used to energize the coils to create a pulsed electromagnetic field. A wide variety of professional and consumer PEMF devices are sold and marketed as FDA registered wellness devices. The majority are manufactured in Germany, Austria and Switzerland and are imported into North America as electric massagers or full body electric yoga mats.  They are either placed on a massage table for clinical use or directly on the floor in the home to practice simple yoga postures. The companies that sell and manufacture them as "general wellness products" are not permitted to make medical claims of effectiveness in treating disease.

Research

Knee osteoarthritis
A 2013 review found that evidence was of very low quality, there might be a benefit for improved function, and there was no evidence for benefit for pain.

In 2017 the wearable ActiPatch PEMF Device was FDA 510k Cleared, Application #K152432, for "Adjunctive treatment of musculoskeletal pain related to: (1) plantar fasciitis of the heel; and (2) osteoarthritis of the knee". This clearance was for over the counter use.

Depression 
Use of pulsed electromagnetic field therapy has been studied for depression. Researchers speculated that "the [postulated] antidepressant effect of PEMF may be specifically attributable to its effects on local brain activity and connectivity."

Postoperative pain 

In 2019 a wearable RecoveryRx PEMF Device was FDA Cleared, Application K190251, for "Adjunctive treatment of postoperative pain".

Musculoskeletal pain 
In January 2020 the wearable ActiPatch was granted FDA 510k Clearance, Application # K192234, for over the counter marketing relating to "Adjunctive treatment of musculoskeletal pain". The manufacturer of ActiPatch, Bioelectronics Corp, submitted 3 clinical studies to support the efficacy of ActiPatch relating to musculoskeletal pain.

See also 
 Radionics
 Pulsed radiofrequency#Therapeutic uses
 Transcranial magnetic stimulation

References

Neurotechnology
Electrotherapy
Bioelectromagnetic-based therapies
Pain management